Aleksander Leines Nordaas (born 21 November 1982, in Mosjøen) is a Norwegian screenwriter and film director, and is a co-owner of the Norwegian production company Yesbox Productions. Aleksander is also a published author and an exhibited photographer and digital artist.

Films
 2005: Sirkel (feature film – scriptwriter, director, DOP, editor). Norway's first no-budget feature. Won the Audience Award at Bergen internasjonale filmfestival in 2005.
 2007: Takk skal du ha (webseries – director, co-script, DOP, editor)
 2008: In Chambers (short film – scriptwriter, director, editor). Awarded "Best Short Film" at WT Os internasjonale filmfestival 2008. and Best Norwegian and Beste Nordic short film at Minimalen in 2009. The full-length short film is available online.
 2012: Thale (feature film – scriptwriter, director, DOP, editor, set designer). Reviewed by Empire as "Beautifully enigmatic and eerie" and Ain't It Cool News as "A truly unique and amazing film." Thale was sold to 50+ countries and screened at a numerous festivals, including Toronto International Film Festival. Thale won the Audience Award at Fantasporto, Best Film at Méliès d'Argent / Espoo Ciné and Best Script at International Film Awards Berlin. 
 2012: Mister Mushy (animated short film – scriptwriter, director, editor). Sold to the Norwegian Broadcasting Corporation.
 2012: Kind of Fishy (animated short film/aquarium – concept, director) Kind of Fishy won the FineArt's Award for Best Exhibit at Galleria Art Festival 2012.
 2013: Mushroom Monster (animated short film – scriptwriter, director, editor) Screened at a numerous children film's festival, including Cinekid and TIFF Kids. International sales agent: SND Films.
 2014: The Strolltroll (animated short film – scriptwriter, director, editor) Sold to the Norwegian Broadcasting Corporation. The short film wrapped up the NRK Christmas Morning Special in 2016. 
 2015: Made in Mosjøen (webseries – producer, scriptwriter, director, editor, sound designer, set designer). 8 award wins. Nominated for The Webby Awards, The Streamy Awards and The Lovie Awards – as well 32 other nominations. Screened at 26 festival. Covered by e.g. Empire, ScreenDaily and Rue Morgue. Reviews: Empire: "A bizarre, Lynchian webseries". Ain't It Cool News: "Simply brilliant.". NRK P1: "Norway's Twin Peaks". Dirge Magazine: "So unique and genuinely funny."
 2016: The Dog (short film – co-scriptwriter, co-director, editor). Screened at Fantastic Fest, TIFF, Grimstad. (April 2017: currently touring festivals)
 2017: Baahdy & Birdy (animated short film – scriptwriter, director). Premiered at Verdens Beste in Tromsø. (April 2017: currently touring festivals).

Published books and apps
 2009: Kadaver (novel) (Novel)
 2012: Kind of Fishy (app) App made by driftwood. Reviews: 148apps: "Incredibly unique and pretty awesome to look at." Fun Educational Apps: "This app is simply beautiful. I can honestly say that I've never reviewed anything like Kind of Fishy"" – *TOP PICK*
 2016: The Strolltroll (Children's book) 1. print self-published after a successful crowdfunding-kampanje. The book was chosen as a Project We Love and Project of the Day. Also published in Norwegian (Rallskanken)
 2017: Mister Mushy (Children's book and app) 1. print self-published after a successful crowdfunding-campaign. The book was chosen as a Project We Love by Kickstarter. Also published in Norwegian (Mister Mjukis).

Photography and Digital Art
 Showcase
 Awards: Best Exhibition (Kind of Fishy), Galleria Art Festival 2012.

Representation (film)
 Circle of Confusion

References

External links 

Living people
1982 births
People from Vefsn
Norwegian screenwriters
Norwegian film directors
Norwegian photographers
Digital artists
Norwegian artists
Norwegian male artists
Norwegian film producers
Norwegian businesspeople
Norwegian male writers
21st-century Norwegian male artists